People who hold office in the Pakistani Parliament are referred to as members of parliament. These consist of:

 Member of Parliament, National Assembly of Pakistan: Representative of the Pakistani citizens to the National Assembly of Pakistan (Urdu: ایوانِ زیریں پاکستان‬), the lower house of the Parliament of Pakistan.
 Member of Parliament, Senate of Pakistan: Representative of the Pakistani provinces, region or states to the Senate of Pakistan (Urdu: ایوانِ بالا پاکستان), the upper house of the Parliament of Pakistan.

Senate of Pakistan 

 List of senators in the 14th Parliament of Pakistan
 List of senators in the 13th Parliament of Pakistan
 List of senators in the 12th Parliament of Pakistan
 List of senators in the 11th Parliament of Pakistan
 List of senators in the 10th Parliament of Pakistan
 List of senators in the 9th Parliament of Pakistan
 List of senators in the 8th Parliament of Pakistan
 List of senators in the 7th Parliament of Pakistan
 List of senators in the 6th Parliament of Pakistan
 List of senators in the 5th Parliament of Pakistan
 List of senators in the 4th Parliament of Pakistan
 List of senators in the 3rd Parliament of Pakistan
 List of senators in the 2nd Parliament of Pakistan
 List of senators in the 1st Parliament of Pakistan

National Assembly of Pakistan 

 List of members of the 15th National Assembly of Pakistan
 List of members of the 14th National Assembly of Pakistan
 List of members of the 13th National Assembly of Pakistan
 List of members of the 12th National Assembly of Pakistan
 List of members of the 11th National Assembly of Pakistan
 List of members of the 10th National Assembly of Pakistan
 List of members of the 9th National Assembly of Pakistan
 List of members of the 8th National Assembly of Pakistan
 List of members of the 7th National Assembly of Pakistan
 List of members of the 6th National Assembly of Pakistan
 List of members of the 5th National Assembly of Pakistan
 List of members of the 4th National Assembly of Pakistan
 List of members of the 3rd National Assembly of Pakistan
 List of members of the 2nd National Assembly of Pakistan
 List of members of the 1st National Assembly of Pakistan

Parliament of Pakistan